Tolminske Ravne is a small settlement high in the hills northeast of Tolmin in the Littoral region of Slovenia. It lies within the boundaries of Triglav National Park.

References

External links
 
 Tolminske Ravne on Geopedia

Populated places in the Municipality of Tolmin